The final of the Men's 400 metres event at the 2003 Pan American Games took place on Friday August 8, 2003, with the heats staged a day earlier in the Juan Pablo Duarte Olympic Stadium in Santo Domingo, Dominican Republic.

Medalists

Records

Results

Notes

See also
2003 World Championships in Athletics – Men's 400 metres
Athletics at the 2004 Summer Olympics – Men's 400 metres

References
Results
usatf

400 metres, Men's
2003